Verin Hand is a village in the Syunik Province of Armenia. Currently, the village is administratively subordinate to the Kapan enlarged community. In Soviet times, the village was part of the Tsav village council.

References 

Populated places in Syunik Province